The Artistic Billiards World Championship was a carom billiards tournament in the discipline of artistic billiards, organized mostly by the Confédération International de Billard Artistique.

Raymond Steylaerts of Belgium won the tournament more times – 6 – than any other player. The current champion is Serdar Gümüş from Turkey.

List of champions
This is the list of Artistic Billiards World Champions, since 1937 (years not shown are years in which the event was not held). The winners have mainly been Europeans, and more commonly Belgians.

References
 CIBA Online: World Championships

 
Artistic billiards
World championships in carom billiards
Recurring sporting events established in 1937
Recurring sporting events disestablished in 2012